Musasa may refer to:
 Musasa language, a language related to the Eastern Indic Bihari languages group
 Félix Mwamba Musasa (born 1976), Congolese footballer
 Kabamba Musasa (born 1982), Congolese footballer
 a shelter hunters would build while away from their homes : see Mbira music

See also
 Msasa, a common name for Brachystegia spiciformis, a medium-sized African tree